Phellinopsis is a genus of four species of fungi in the family Hymenochaetaceae. It was newly circumscribed in 2010, containing P. occidentalis and the type species P. conchata. P. junipericola and P. resupinata were added in 2012, and P. asetosa in 2015.

References

External links

Hymenochaetaceae
Agaricomycetes genera
Taxa named by Yu-Cheng Dai